Kenrich Lo Williams (born December 2, 1994), nicknamed "Kenny Hustle", is an American professional basketball player for the Oklahoma City Thunder of the National Basketball Association (NBA). He played college basketball for the TCU Horned Frogs of the Big 12 Conference.

High school career
Williams attended University High School in Waco, Texas and joined the varsity team as a junior under coach Rodney Smith. As a senior, Williams averaged 14.6 points, 9.9 rebounds and 2.1 steals per game. He earned District 8-4A defensive player of the year honors and led the squad to a 28-5 record. Coming out of high school, Williams did not receive a single Division I offer. He attributes this to playing only one season of AAU ball.

College career
Williams attended New Mexico Junior College and averaged 10.1 points and 6.9 rebounds per game in his freshman season. He was recruited to TCU Horned Frogs, which went winless in conference games in the season before his arrival. Williams posted 8.6 points and 6.7 rebounds per game as a sophomore on an 18-15 team. Williams missed the entire 2015-16 season due to a knee injury which required surgery, calling it one of the toughest years of his basketball career as TCU struggled to 12 wins.

As a fourth year junior, Williams averaged 11.4 points and 9.7 rebounds per game while shooting 49.5 percent from the floor. He had 19 double-doubles, leading the Big 12, and helped lead the team to a 24-15 season. Williams had 18 points and eight rebounds in the 85-82 upset of Kansas in the quarterfinals of the Big 12 Tournament. In the second round of the NIT, an 86-68 win over Richmond, Williams recorded the first triple-double in TCU history with 11 points, 14 rebounds and 10 assists. After posting 25 points and 12 rebounds in the NIT championship game versus Georgia Tech, Williams was named NIT Most Valuable Player.

Coming into his senior season, Williams was a Preseason Big 12 Honorable Mention. On December 6, 2017, Williams scored a career-high 27 points in a 94-83 win over SMU. He sat out a game on December 22, against William and Mary due to a knee sprain. As a senior, Williams posted 13.2 points and 9.3 rebounds per game, second in the Big 12 Conference. Williams was selected to the USBWA All-District VII and NABC All-District 8 Second Team. He was named to the Second Team All-Big 12. He led TCU to a 21-12 record and 6 seed in the NCAA tournament. In his final game as a Horned Frog, a 57-52 upset loss to Syracuse, Williams scored 14 points.

Professional career

New Orleans Pelicans (2018–2020)
After going undrafted in the 2018 NBA draft, Williams signed with the Denver Nuggets for NBA Summer League play. On July 24, Williams signed a deal with the New Orleans Pelicans. Williams later made his professional, NBA debut on October 17, 2018, in a blowout win over the Houston Rockets. During his rookie season, he was assigned to the Westchester Knicks of the NBA G League, making his G League debut on November 23.  On January 30, 2019, Williams set a new career high in scoring with 21 points, and set personal bests in field goals (eight), 3-pointers (five), assists (three) and minutes (38) in a 99–105 loss to the Denver Nuggets.

Oklahoma City Thunder (2020–present)
On November 24, 2020, Williams was traded to the Oklahoma City Thunder.

On July 20, 2022, Williams re-signed with the Thunder on a four-year, $27.2M contract extension. On March 2, 2023, the Thunder announced that he suffered a left wrist injury and would undergo surgery to address the issue, ending his 2022–23 season.

Career statistics

NBA

Regular season

|-
| style="text-align:left;"| 
| style="text-align:left;"| New Orleans
| 46 || 29 || 23.5 || .384 || .333 || .684 || 4.8 || 1.8 || 1.0 || .4 || 6.1
|-
| style="text-align:left;"| 
| style="text-align:left;"| New Orleans
| 39 || 18 || 21.3 || .347 || .258 || .346 || 4.8 || 1.5 || .7 || .5 || 3.5
|-
| style="text-align:left;"| 
| style="text-align:left;"| Oklahoma City
| 66 || 13 || 21.6 || .533 || .444 || .571 || 4.1 || 2.3 || .8 || .3 || 8.0
|-
| style="text-align:left;"| 
| style="text-align:left;"| Oklahoma City
| 41 || 0 || 21.9 || .461 || .339 || .545 || 4.5 || 2.2 || .9 || .2 || 7.4
|-
| style="text-align:left;"| 
| style="text-align:left;"| Oklahoma City
| 53 || 10 || 22.8 || .517 || .373 || .436 || 4.9 || 2.0 || .8 || .3 || 8.0
|- class="sortbottom"
| style="text-align:center;" colspan="2"| Career
| 253 || 70 || 22.2 || .468 || .352 || .520 || 4.6 || 2.0 || .9 || .3 || 6.8

College

|-
| style="text-align:left;"| 2014-15
| style="text-align:left;"| TCU
| 33 || 17 || 27.8 || .477 || .355 || .607 || 6.7 || 1.4 || .9 || 1.0 || 8.6
|-
| style="text-align:left;"| 2016-17
| style="text-align:left;"| TCU
| 37 || 36 || 32.7 || .495 || .363 || .586 || 9.7 || 2.7 || 1.5 || .6 || 11.4 
|- 
| style="text-align:left;"| 2017-18
| style="text-align:left;"| TCU
| 32 || 32 || 36.0 || .477 || .395 || .688 || 9.3 || 3.9 || 1.8 || .5 || 13.2
|- class="sortbottom"
| style="text-align:center;" colspan="2"| Career
| 102 || 85 || 32.2 || .484 || .375 || .625 || 8.6 || 2.7 || 1.4 || .7 || 11.0

References

External links
TCU Horned Frogs bio

1994 births
Living people
African-American basketball players
American men's basketball players
Basketball players from Texas
New Orleans Pelicans players
NMJC Thunderbirds men's basketball players
Oklahoma City Thunder players
Shooting guards
Small forwards
Sportspeople from Waco, Texas
TCU Horned Frogs men's basketball players
Undrafted National Basketball Association players
Westchester Knicks players
21st-century African-American sportspeople